Pago Youth B is the reserve team for Pago Youth FC, a football team based in Pago Pago, American Samoa. It currently plays in the country's top division, FFAS Senior League, competing with its own first team. It is unusual for a reserve team to compete in the same league as its first team, as this can lead to accusations of cheating, where the reserve team may be seen to let the first team win. This is the case in other leagues where B teams are allowed to compete, like Spain.

Squad

History
In the last decade, Pago Youth B have competed in the top flight of American Samoa on five occasions - the 2013, 2012, 2011, 2010 and 2009 seasons. In 2011 the B team was separated from the first team at the group stage, but met in the semi-finals of the knock-out stage.

References

Football clubs in American Samoa